"Fantasy" is a song by British rapper Bashy, featuring vocals from Indian singer and actress, Preeya Kalidas. The song was released as a single on July 26, 2010 via digital download. It interpolates Baby D's "Let Me Be Your Fantasy". The music video for "Fantasy" was filmed in Los Angeles, while Bashy was supporting Gorillaz' North American tour. The video does not feature Kalidas. The single charted at No. 88 on the UK Singles Chart.

Track listing
 "Fantasy" - 3:53
 "Fantasy" (Peter Doyle Fantastic Fantasy Mix) - 7:58
 "Fantasy" (Specimen A Mix) - 5:24

Chart performance

References

2010 songs
2010 singles
Bashy songs
Preeya Kalidas songs
Mercury Records singles
Drum and bass songs